Corydoras areio is a tropical freshwater fish belonging to the Corydoradinae sub-family of the family Callichthyidae. It originates in inland waters in South America. Corydoras areio is found in the Upper Paraguay River basin.

References

Knaack, J., 2000. Eine weitere neue Art der Gattung Corydoras Lacépède, 1803 aus dem Mato Grosso (Pisces, Siluriformes, Callichthyidae). VDA-aktuell 2:45-56. 

Corydoras
Catfish of South America
Taxa named by Joachim Knaack
Fish described in 2000